Federico Crescentini (13 April 1982 – 15 December 2006) was a Sammarinese football defender. He played eight times for his country's national team.

Club career
Crescentini played in the Italian amateur leagues before moving to Sanmarinese side Tre Fiori in 2005.

International career
He made his debut for San Marino in a May 2002 friendly match against Estonia, coming on as a substitute for Giacomo Maiani. He earned his 8th and final cap against Ireland in November 2006, substituting Damiano Vannucci.

Death
He died while on holiday in Acapulco, Mexico when he tried to help a friend in trouble, but despite rescuing her, he drowned. He was the third footballer to drown in the course of a single week, after Juventus FC's youth players Riccardo Neri and Alessio Ferramosca drowned at the club's training ground. At the time of his death, he was 24. His funeral took place at MonteGiardino in San Marino.

External links

References

1982 births
2006 deaths
Sammarinese footballers
San Marino international footballers
Association football defenders
Accidental deaths in Mexico
Deaths by drowning
S.P. Tre Fiori players